is a private distance learning university (for graduate studies) in Yokohama, Kanagawa, Japan. It was established in 2008 as part of SBI Group, a financial services company.

External links
 Official website 

Educational institutions established in 2008
Private universities and colleges in Japan
Universities and colleges in Kanagawa Prefecture
SoftBank Group
Universities and colleges in Yokohama
2008 establishments in Japan